In evolutionary biology, mimicry in plants is where a plant organism evolves to resemble another organism physically or chemically, increasing the mimic's Darwinian fitness. Mimicry in plants has been studied far less than mimicry in animals, with fewer documented cases and peer-reviewed studies. However, it may provide protection against herbivory, or may deceptively encourage mutualists, like pollinators, to provide a service without offering a reward in return.

Types of plant mimicry include Bakerian, where female flowers imitate males of the same species, Müllerian mimicry of the flower or fruit, where a plant mimics a rewarding flower (Dodsonian), luring pollinators by mimicking another species of flower, or fruit where feeders of the other species are attracted to a fake fruit to distribute seeds,  Vavilovian, where a weed is unintentionally artificially selected to resemble a crop plant, Pouyannian, in which a flower imitates a female mate for a pollinating insect, Batesian, where a harmless species deter predators by mimicking the characteristics of a harmful species, and leaf mimicry, where a plant resembles a nearby plant to evade the attention of herbivores.

Bakerian
Bakerian mimicry, named after English naturalist Herbert Baker, is a form of automimicry or intraspecific mimicry that occurs within a single species.  In plants, the female flowers mimic male flowers of their own species, cheating pollinators out of a reward.  This reproductive mimicry may not be readily apparent as members of the same species may still exhibit some degree of sexual dimorphism, i.e. the phenotypic difference between males and females of the same species.  It is common in many species of Caricaceae, a family of flowering plants in the order Brassicales, found primarily in tropical regions of Central and South America, and Africa.

Dodsonian
Dodsonian mimicry, named after American botanist, orchidologist, and taxonomist, Calaway H. Dodson, is a form of reproductive floral mimicry, but the model belongs to a different species than the mimic. By providing similar sensory signals as the model flower, it can lure its pollinators.  Like Bakerian mimics, no nectar is provided.

Examples 
Epidendrum ibaguense, a species of epiphytic orchid of the genus Epidendrum that occurs in Trinidad, French Guiana, Venezuela, Colombia, and northern Brazil, resembles flowers of Lantana camara and Asclepias curassavica (commonly called Mexican butterfly weed, blood-flower, scarlet milkweed, or tropical milkweed), both are species of flowering plant with the first in the verbena family, while the latter belongs to the milkweed family, and both are native to the American tropics.  Epidendrum ibaguense is pollinated by monarch butterfly (Danaus plexippus) and perhaps hummingbirds. Similar cases are seen in some other species of the same family.  The mimetic species may still have pollinators of its own though, for example a Lamellicorn beetle, which usually pollinates correspondingly colored Cistus flowers, is also known to aid in pollination of Ophrys species that are normally pollinated by bees.

Vavilovian

Vavilovian mimicry (also known as crop mimicry or weed mimicry), named after Russian plant geneticist who identified the centres of origin of cultivated plants, Nikolai Vavilov, is a form of mimicry in plants where a weed comes to share one or more characteristics with a domesticated plant through generations of artificial selection. Selection against the weed may occur by killing a young or adult weed, separating its seeds from those of the crop (winnowing), or both.  This has been done manually since Neolithic times, and in more recent years by agricultural machinery.

Pouyannian

Many plants have evolved to appear like other organisms, most commonly insects.  This can have wide-ranging benefits including increasing pollination. In Pouyannian mimicry, flowers mimic a potential female mate visually, but the key stimuli are often chemical and tactile.

Examples 
The hammer orchid (Drakaea spp., an endangered genus of orchid that is native to Australia) is one of the most notable examples.  The orchid has both visual and olfactory mimics of a female wasp to lure males to both deposit and pick up pollen.

The orchid Epipactis helleborine is physiologically and morphologically adapted to attract social wasps as their primary pollinators. Social wasps feed their larvae on insects like caterpillars. To locate that prey, they use a combination of visual and olfactory cues. The flowers of E. helleborine and E. purpurata emit green-leaf volatiles (GLVs), which are attractive to foragers of the social wasps Vespula germanica and V. vulgaris. Several E. helleborine GLVs that induced a response in the antennae of wasps were also emitted by cabbage leaves infested with caterpillars (Pieris brassicae), which are common prey items for wasps. Despite a large nectar reward, the species is almost entirely overlooked by other pollinators.

Carrion flowers mimic the scent and appearance of rotting flesh to attract necrophagous (carrion-feeding) insects like flesh flies (Sarcophagidae), blowflies (Calliphoridae), house flies (Muscidae) and some beetles (e.g., Dermestidae and Silphidae) which search for dead animals to use as brood sites. The decaying smell of the flower comes from oligosulfides, decayed proteins that contain amino acids methionine and cysteine. While carrion flowers do produce a small amount of nectar, this does not necessarily make its relationship to necrophagous insects mutualistic. Insects lay eggs on the carrion flowers, meaning they mistake them for oviposition sites. The nectar acts as a lure to bring the insects closer to the reproductive parts of the flower.

Batesian 
In Batesian mimicry, named after the English naturalist Henry Walter Bates, a harmless species has evolved to imitate the warning signals of a harmful species directed at a predator.

Examples 
Thorn mimicry of two types has been observed in plants. The first, a special case of intra-organismic Batesian mimicry characteristic of Aloe sp. (Liliaceae), W. filifera (Palmaceae), and dozens of species of Agave, including A. applanta, A. salmiana, and A. obscura. These plants develop thorn-like imprints or colorations on the face of their leaves due to the teeth along the margins of that leaf (or another leaf) pressing sustained indentations into the flesh of the non-spiny parts.

The second type of thorn mimicry, a more classic case of Batesian mimicry, involves the pointed, colorful organs like buds, leaves and fruit of memetic plant species that mimic aposematic colorful thorns not found anywhere else in the organism.

Several plants growing in Israel, Estonia, Greece, and Japan exhibit possible spider web mimicry. Dense, white trichomes are produced on newly extended stems and leaves that deter herbivory due to predatory habit or toxicity. This may be a case of visual mimicry or perceptual exploitation. Case examples include the new buds of Onopordum from Israel, Carthamus sp. from Greece, flower heads of Arctium tomentosum from Estonia, a fledgling leaf of Tussilago farfara from Estonia, and new fronds of Osmunda japonica from Japan.

Cryptic mimicry 
In ecology, crypsis is an organism's ability to avoid detection by other organisms. Therefore, cryptic mimicry is a situation where a prey organism deceives a potential predator by providing false signals or a lack of signals. Cryptic mimicry in plants is usually achieved visually.

Examples 
Boquila trifoliata, a South American member of the family Lardizabalaceae, is a climbing vine with a highly variable phenotype. It is capable of mimicking the leaf features of plant species that it clings to, adopting color shape and size. By camouflaging its leafy appendages, Boquila lowers its rate of herbivory.

See also
Chemical mimicry
Drakaea
Lysiana exocarpi
Pseudocopulation
Deception in animals

Notes

References

Sources

Camouflage
Mimicry
Pollination
Polymorphism (biology)